Magalia (formerly Butte Mills and Dogtown) is an unincorporated community and census-designated place (CDP) in Butte County, California, United States. The population was 11,310 at the 2010 census.

History
Originally established after the 1849 California Gold Rush as a mining camp, the town was first called Mountain View. A dog breeding operation started in 1850 which led to the name Dogtown. A post office opened in 1857, which was shared with the adjacent settlement of Mill City; the two eventually united. In 1861 the name was changed to Magalia after the Latin word for cottages.

On April 12, 1859, at the Willard Claim, a hydraulic mine in the Feather River Canyon northeast of the town, a 54-pound (20 kg) gold nugget was discovered, the largest in the world at the time. Dubbed the "Dogtown nugget", it made the town famous.

2018 fire

The community suffered extensive damage in the Camp Fire, a wildfire which began on November 8, 2018.  As of December 13, Butte County Sheriff's Department reported that at least seven people died in Magalia during the Camp fire. Some survivors sheltered in place at a Baptist church along the only evacuation route north of the ridge.

Geography and natural history
There are numerous flora and fauna species found in the vicinity including mammals such as Black tailed deer, raccoon, and grey squirrel. A considerable number of amphibians are also found such as the Rough-skinned Newt, whose southern range in the California interior occurs near Magalia. The soil, deep reddish-brown loam for the most part, supports forest dominated by tall incense cedar and bull pine.

Climate
According to the Köppen Climate Classification system, Magalia has a hot-summer Mediterranean climate, abbreviated "Csa" on climate maps.

Demographics

2010
The 2010 United States Census reported that Magalia had a population of 11,310. The racial makeup of Magalia was 10,398 (91.9%) White, 40 (0.4%) African American, 141 (1.2%) Native American, 90 (0.8%) Asian, 17 (0.2%) Pacific Islander, 134 (1.2%) from other races, and 490 (4.3%) from two or more races. Hispanic or Latino of any race were 765 persons (6.8%).

The Census reported that 11,297 people (99.9% of the population) lived in households, 13 (0.1%) lived in non-institutionalized group quarters, and 0 (0%) were institutionalized.

There were 4,825 households, out of which 1,217 (25.2%) had children under the age of 18 living in them, 2,483 (51.5%) were opposite-sex married couples living together, 515 (10.7%) had a female householder with no husband present, 278 (5.8%) had a male householder with no wife present. There were 311 (6.4%) unmarried opposite-sex partnerships, and 34 (0.7%) same-sex married couples or partnerships. 1,239 households (25.7%) were made up of individuals, and 623 (12.9%) had someone living alone who was 65 years of age or older. The average household size was 2.34. There were 3,276 families (67.9% of all households); the average family size was 2.75.

The population was spread out, with 2,165 people (19.1%) under the age of 18, 789 people (7.0%) aged 18 to 24, 2,104 people (18.6%) aged 25 to 44, 3,573 people (31.6%) aged 45 to 64, and 2,679 people (23.7%) who were 65 years of age or older. The median age was 49.0 years. For every 100 females, there were 97.8 males. For every 100 females age 18 and over, there were 95.7 males.

The homeowner vacancy rate was 2.7%; the rental vacancy rate was 7.1%. 8,212 people (72.6% of the population) lived in owner-occupied housing units and 3,085 people (27.3%) lived in rental housing units.

2000
At the 2000 census, there were 10,569 people, 4,395 households and 3,199 families residing in the CDP. The racial makeup of the CDP was 94.09% White, 0.41% Black or African American, 1.20% Native American, 0.59% Asian, 0.09% Pacific Islander, 1.03% from other races, and 2.59% from two or more races. 4.88% of the population were Hispanic or Latino of any race.

There were 4,395 households, of which 24.3% had children under the age of 18 living with them, 59.8% were married couples living together, 9.0% had a female householder with no husband present, and 27.2% were non-families. 22.3% of all households were made up of individuals, and 12.7% had someone living alone who was 65 years of age or older. The average household size was 2.38 and the average family size was 2.73.

Age distribution was 21.9% under the age of 18, 5.4% from 18 to 24, 20.7% from 25 to 44, 24.6% from 45 to 64, and 27.5% who were 65 years of age or older. The median age was 47 years. For every 100 females, there were 94.5 males. For every 100 females age 18 and over, there were 92.4 males.

The median household income was $32,337, and the median family income was $38,654. Males had a median income of $36,909 versus $21,892 for females. The per capita income for the CDP was $16,904. About 9.2% of families and 12.7% of the population were below the poverty line, including 18.4% of those under age 18 and 5.2% of those age 65 or over.

References

External links
Magalia info, weather, history and more
History of Dogtown

Census-designated places in Butte County, California
Paradise, California
Populated places in the Sierra Nevada (United States)
Census-designated places in California